Tomasz Janusz Jaskóła (born 31 July 1974, Częstochowa) is a Polish politician and teacher. Member of the Sejm (2015-2019).

Biography 
He graduated from the Jan Długosz University. He belonged to the Poland Together (2014–2015) and The Republicans (2015).

In 2014, he unsuccessfully applied for the Silesian Regional Assembly from the KWW Independent Self-government of the Silesian Voivodeship. He started to the Sejm in the 28 Częstochowa district from the first place from Kukiz'15, organized by Paweł Kukiz. He obtained the mandate of the 8th term of Sejm, receiving 10,952 votes. In the local elections in 2018 he became the candidate of Kukiz'15 for the presidency of Częstochowa. He received 5.27% of votes and he did not get a choice for this function. He also ran unsuccessfully in the European Parliament election in 2019. In August 2019 he left the Kukiz'15 parliamentary club, co-creating the parliamentary association of the Real Politics Union. He did not apply for a parliamentary re-election in 2019.

References 

1974 births
Living people
Jan Długosz University alumni
People from Częstochowa
Poland Together politicians
Members of the Polish Sejm 2015–2019